

1800s (the debut of streetcar service and its lines)

1898 (pre-IRC)

1904 (Post-Pan American Expo)
The Pan-American Exposition was held from May 1 through November 2, 1901.

1916 (post WW I) 

After the amalgamation of a number of streetcar companies during the early start of the 20th century, the International Railway Company began assignment of route numbers to virtually all of its routes it operated.  Some truncated versions (such as "Abt" for Abbott Road, and "Bst" for Best Street) remained, but were slowly assigned numbers, similar to the current route numbers used in today's NFTA Metro routes.

1935 (late-depression years) 

Shortly after 1935, major changes were becoming evident, with elimination of streetcar service on virtually all west-side lines, including (from west to east) 5-Niagara, 3-Grant, 7-Hoyt and 20-Elmwood streetcars, and (from north to south) 10-West Utica, and 22-Connecticut streetcars.

Post-1940, the only streetcar that crossed Main Street, continuing westbound, was the 23-Fillmore/Hertel car operating between South Park Avenue in South Buffalo and Tonawanda Street using a loop over Tonawanda, Grace, Niagara and Hertel.

Later half of the 1930s (the start of the decline of streetcars) 

Shortly after 1935, the removal of streetcar lines became more evident after the introduction of new routes being operated with buses, instead of introducing new streetcar lines.

The first group of streetcar routes that reappeared as bus routes were the westside lines, easy to explain with the narrowness of the streets and their zigzagging over the courses of many streets.  The routes that fell to bus service include:

  Connecticut Street (Route 22 was replaced with the 22-Porter/Best bus route, eliminating service on Connecticut altogether)
  Delavan Avenue (Became Route D, then Route 26)
  Elmwood Avenue (Route 20)
  Grant Street (Route 3)
  Hoyt Street (Route 7 was replaced with the 7-Baynes/Richmond bus route, removing service from Hoyt)
  Michigan/Forest (Route 21)
  Niagara Street (Route 5)
  West Utica Street (Route 10.  Weekend service using route 11 was also eliminated, leaving 12-Utica streetcars to operate daily.)

In addition, elsewhere:

  Abbott Road (Route 14)
  Bailey Avenue (Route 19 merged with the Route B-Bailey bus route, creating a single service from the City Line in the north to South Park in the south section of Buffalo.)

1940s & 1950s (the last decade of streetcar service) 

In 1941, four streetcar lines ended service.

 Monday, April 14, 1941 - routes 1-William and 18-Jefferson cease streetcar service.
 Late September, 1941 - routes 15-Seneca and 16-South Park cease streetcar service.

After these dates, World War II had set in, creating a six-year gap in the escalation of lost streetcar routes, due to the shortage of manpower to fix the newly implemented buses, and from the scarcity of precious metal that was being used in wartime production of supplies.

At this time, the International Railway Company encouraged the riding public to return to the use of streetcars and support them in their cooperation with the war cause.

In 1947 and 1948, removal of streetcar service began again.

 Thursday, February 6, 1947 - route 12-Utica ended service.
 Friday, February 20, 1948 - routes 2-Clinton and 6-Sycamore ended service.

In 1950, the final six streetcar routes ended service, replaced immediately by buses.

 Sunday, June 18, 1950 - all Cold Spring Depot streetcar service ceases (Rts. 8-Main, 9-Parkside/Zoo & 13-Kensington).
 Saturday, July 1, 1950 - all Broadway Depot streetcar service ceases (Rts. 4-Broadway, 23-Fillmore/Hertel and 24-Genesee).

After the end of passenger service, the Niagara Frontier Transit Corporation spent approximately six months removing the remaining 175 streetcars from the Cold Springs and Broadway streetcar barns over the remaining streetcar trackage on Broadway, Fillmore Avenue,  Main Street and Hertel to the Military car barn where the outer bodies were removed and burned.

The streetcar tracks were usually covered up with asphalt, and occasionally during major road work, construction crews may dig up remains of tracks that have been buried under mere inches or feet for the past fifty years.

At the present time, Main Street (NYS 5) is undergoing extensive reconstruction of the roadbed and in areas of roadway that were not dug up during the construction of the Metro Rail line (using tunnel boring instead), the tracks are being brought back to the surface and dismantled.

Metro Rail (1985-present) 

Though termed a "light rail subway", the Metro Rail is worthy of mention in that the portion operating in Downtown Buffalo from the Fountain Plaza to Erie Canal Harbor stations operates similar to a normally run streetcar service.

The route originates in Downtown Buffalo on Main Street at Erie Canal Harbor Station (previously Auditorium), just north of Scott and Hanover Streets.  The light rail line continues north, then north-east along Main Street, stopping at 5 above-ground stations in Downtown Buffalo, then 8 underground stations (like a subway) until arriving at University Station, located a brief distance northeast of Niagara Falls Boulevard.

Explanation of abbreviated businesses 
DL&W refers to Delaware, Lackawanna and Western Railroad.

NYC refers to New York Central Railroad.

See also 
 Buffalo Metro Rail
 International Railway Co.
 Niagara Frontier Transportation Authority

References 

Transportation in Buffalo, New York
Streetcars in New York (state)
Buffalo, New York-related lists